Opisthoxia is a genus of moths in the family Geometridae.

Species
Opisthoxia albanaria (Oberthür, 1916)
Opisthoxia alectaria (Guenée, 1857)
Opisthoxia amabilis (Cramer, 1777)
Opisthoxia amphiaria (Oberthür, 1916)
Opisthoxia amphissaria (Oberthür, 1916)
Opisthoxia amphistrataria (Oberthür, 1916)
Opisthoxia archidiaria (Oberthür, 1916)
Opisthoxia argenticincta Warren, 1905
Opisthoxia asopis (Druce, 1892)
Opisthoxia aspledon (Druce, 1892)
Opisthoxia aurelia Dognin, 1903
Opisthoxia bella (Butler, 1881)
Opisthoxia bellaoides (Dognin, 1894)
Opisthoxia bimaculata (Warren, 1907)
Opisthoxia bolivari (Oberthür, 1916)
Opisthoxia bracteata (Butler, 1885)
Opisthoxia branickiaria (Oberthür, 1883)
Opisthoxia cabima (Schaus, 1923)
Opisthoxia cassandra Dyar, 1912
Opisthoxia casta Warren, 1904
Opisthoxia ceres (Oberthür, 1916)
Opisthoxia chouya (Thierry-Mieg, 1905)
Opisthoxia claudiaria Schaus, 1901
Opisthoxia cluana (Druce, 1900)
Opisthoxia columbaria (E. D. Jones, 1921)
Opisthoxia conjuncta (Herbulot, 1988)
Opisthoxia consequa (Warren, 1909)
Opisthoxia contrariata (Warren, 1904)
Opisthoxia corinnaria (Guenée, 1858)
Opisthoxia corinnoides (Thierry-Mieg, 1916)
Opisthoxia crepuscularia (Warren, 1907)
Opisthoxia croceata Warren, 1907
Opisthoxia croesaria (Schaus, 1901)
Opisthoxia curvilinea (Warren, 1909)
Opisthoxia danaeata (Walker, 1861)
Opisthoxia descimoni (Herbulot, 1988)
Opisthoxia dora (Schaus, 1901)
Opisthoxia elysiata (Walker, 1861)
Opisthoxia epichrysops (Oberthür, 1916)
Opisthoxia erionia (Druce, 1900)
Opisthoxia eusiraria (Oberthür, 1916)
Opisthoxia eustyocharia (Oberthür, 1916)
Opisthoxia farantes (Schaus, 1901)
Opisthoxia fasciata (Schaus, 1898)
Opisthoxia formosante (Cramer, 1779)
Opisthoxia fosteri Warren, 1909
Opisthoxia geryon (Druce, 1900)
Opisthoxia gloriosa Bastelberger, 1909
Opisthoxia haemon (Druce, 1900)
Opisthoxia halala (Druce, 1900)
Opisthoxia humilis (Warren, 1905)
Opisthoxia hybridata (Warren, 1905)
Opisthoxia integra (Bastelberger, 1907)
Opisthoxia interrupta Schaus, 1911
Opisthoxia laticlava Warren, 1904
Opisthoxia leucophis (Bastelberger, 1911)
Opisthoxia limboguttata (Felder & Rogenhofer, 1875)
Opisthoxia lineata (Warren, 1904)
Opisthoxia lucilla (Butler, 1881)
Opisthoxia lyllaria (Guenée, 1858)
Opisthoxia lyonetaria (Snellen, 1874)
Opisthoxia metargyria (Walker, 1867)
Opisthoxia miletia (Druce, 1892)
Opisthoxia molpadia (Druce, 1892)
Opisthoxia monanaria (Schaus, 1923)
Opisthoxia ockendeni Warren, 1907
Opisthoxia olivenzaria (Oberthür, 1916)
Opisthoxia omphale Prout, 1910
Opisthoxia orion (Warren, 1904)
Opisthoxia pamphilaria (Guenée, 1858)
Opisthoxia pepita (Dognin, 1896)
Opisthoxia phrynearia (Schaus, 1912)
Opisthoxia praeamabilis (Oberthür, 1916)
Opisthoxia projecta (Herbulot, 1988)
Opisthoxia salubaea Dyar, 1912
Opisthoxia sardes (Druce, 1900)
Opisthoxia saturaria Schaus, 1923
Opisthoxia saturniaria (Herrich-Schäffer, 1855)
Opisthoxia subalba (Thierry-Mieg, 1916)
Opisthoxia superamabilis (Oberthür, 1916)
Opisthoxia transversata (Warren, 1904)
Opisthoxia trimaculata (Warren, 1907)
Opisthoxia uncinata (Schaus, 1912)
Opisthoxia vigilans Warren, 1904
Opisthoxia virginalis (Oberthür, 1916)
Opisthoxia vitenaria Schaus, 1923

References

External links

Ennominae
Geometridae genera